Pasquo is a region of Nashville, along State Route 100 in Davidson County, within Bellevue. It is incorporated as part of the Metropolitan Government of Nashville and Davidson County.

Formerly a rural area, Pasquo has experienced rapid growth in recent years as the Nashville suburbs expand westward. As Pasquo is neither an incorporated municipality nor a census-designated place, its population is not measured or reported by the US Census. Pasquo is home to "Radio Free Nashville," the low-power FM radio radio station WRFN-LP. WRFN was the seventh community radio barnraising of the Prometheus Radio Project.

Pasquo is the short name for Pasquotank, and a now-defunct neighboring community was once known as Tank. The name was taken from Pasquotank County, North Carolina, where early settlers came from.

Pasquo is the location of the northern terminus of the Natchez Trace Parkway, the Loveless Cafe, Chaffin’s Barn Dinner Theatre,  Union Bridge, Harpeth Valley School,  Bellevue YMCA, Old Pasquo School and the State of Tennessee abandoned "Cold War" communications Center.

References

Natchez Trace
Neighborhoods in Nashville, Tennessee
Populated places in Davidson County, Tennessee